The 2011 NCAA Bowling Championship was the eighth annual tournament to determine the national champion of women's NCAA collegiate ten-pin bowling. The tournament was played at Skore Lanes in Taylor, Michigan from April 15–16, 2011.

Maryland Eastern Shore defeated Vanderbilt in the championship match, 4 games to 2 (215–197, 164–193, 201–248, 234–204, 235–166, 192–181), to win their second national title. The Hawks were coached by Sharon Brummell.

Maryland Eastern Shore's Kristina Frahm was named the tournament's Most Outstanding Player. Frahm, along with four other bowlers, also comprised the All Tournament Team.

Qualification
Since there is only one national collegiate championship for women's bowling, all NCAA bowling programs (whether from Division I, Division II, or Division III) were eligible. A total of 8 teams were invited to contest this championship, which consisted of a modified double-elimination style tournament.

Tournament bracket 
Site: Skore Lanes, Taylor, Michigan
Host: Detroit Titans

† Fairleigh Dickinson defeated Vanderbilt in a tiebreaker, 107–105.

Championship Match

All-tournament team
Kristina Frahm, Maryland Eastern Shore (Most Outstanding Player)
Tracy Ganjoin, Fairleigh Dickinson
Brittni Hamilton, Vanderbilt
Kristina Mickelson, Nebraska
Maria Rodriguez, Maryland Eastern Shore

References

NCAA Bowling Championship
Detroit Mercy Titans
2011 in American sports
2011 in bowling
2011 in sports in Michigan
April 2011 sports events in the United States